Martin Julen (born 31 March 1928) is a Swiss alpine skier. He competed in two events at the 1956 Winter Olympics.

References

External links
 

1928 births
Living people
Swiss male alpine skiers
Olympic alpine skiers of Switzerland
Alpine skiers at the 1956 Winter Olympics
People from Zermatt
Sportspeople from Valais
20th-century Swiss people